Madonna and Child with an Apple or Madonna and Child Holding an Apple is a tempera and gold on panel painting by Carlo Crivelli, executed c. 1480, now in the Victoria and Albert Museum in London, having entered it as part of the Jones collection - its previous provenance is unknown. It is signed OPVS CAROLI CRIVELLI VENETI.

Usually placed between the artist's Lenti Madonna and Ancona Madonna and Child in terms of dating, it was produced for private devotion. Several replicas are known - one each in a private collection in Venice (possibly seen by Testi in 1915), the Bracht Collection in Berlin, the Museo della Ca' d'Oro in Venice (school of Crivelli with variations), whilst one in the Eissler Collection in Vienna is now in New York (with variations; attributed to the Master of the Brera Predella by Drey in 1927).

References

1480 paintings
Apple
Paintings in the collection of the Victoria and Albert Museum